Lazăr Edeleanu (1 September 1861, Bucharest – 7 April 1941, Bucharest) was a Romanian chemist of Jewish origin. He is known for being the first chemist to synthesize amphetamine at the University of Berlin and for inventing the modern method of refining crude oil.

Research activity in England and Romania
After completing lyceum at Saint Sava High School, he went to study at the University of Berlin. He obtained his doctorate in Chemistry in 1887, with thesis "About some derivatives of phenyl methacrylic acid and phenyl isobutyric acid" written under the direction of August Wilhelm von Hofmann. After that, Edeleanu worked for some time at the Royal College of Artillery in London as a lecturer and as an assistant to Professor Hodgkinson. During this period, he collaborated with Charles Frederick Cross and Edward John Bevan to create a certain type of artificial fireproof silk. With Raphael Meldola he created oxazine-based dyes.

Back in Romania, he was hired by the chemist Constantin I. Istrati as an assistant and then as a lecturer at the University of Bucharest's Faculty of Sciences. in the Organic Chemistry Department. In 1906 he was appointed Head of the Chemistry Laboratory at the Geology Institute, founded that year, and director of Vega Refinery near Ploiești, a refinery owned at that time by the German company Diskont). In 1907, along with Ion Tănăsescu, he co-organized the Petroleum Congress in Bucharest and co-authored a monograph on the physical and technical properties of Romanian crude oil.

His most significant invention, was the Edeleanu process (1908). It is a process in which petroleum is refined with liquid sulfur dioxide to selectively extract aromatic hydrocarbons (benzene, toluene, xylene, etc.). The procedure was first applied experimentally in Romania at the Vega Refinery and later spread to France (notably Rouen), Germany, and subsequently throughout the world.

Research and business in Germany
In 1910, Edeleanu settled in Germany where he founded a company called "Allgemeine Gesellschaft für Chemische Industrie". Due to the success of the name "Edeleanu", the company changed its name to Edeleanu GmbH in 1930. During the Nazi regime, it was bought by the Deutsche Erdöl-AG. Several ownership changes later it was acquired by Uhde GmbH in 2002, which is owned by the Thyssenkrupp trust. The name Edeleanu is still used for the refinery department until this day.

Edeleanu returned to Romania, where he died in Bucharest in April 1941.

Heritage

By 1960, there were 80 Edeleanu facilities worldwide. The Edeleanu Method is still used today, in its many variations, and remains the basic process for manufacturing high quality oils.

Edeleanu obtained 212 patents for inventions in Romania, the United States, Germany, France, Austria, Sweden, and Holland.

Prizes and honors
  1910 –  Member of the Society of Natural Sciences in Moscow
  1925 –  Honorary Member of the Institution of Petroleum Technologists in London (1925)
  1932 –  Theophilus Redwood Medal for lifetime scientific achievement in analytic chemistry.

References

Sources
FCER - Contribuția evreilor din România la cultură și civilizație, Editura Hasefer, 2004 p. 215-216 (Federation of Jewish Communities in Romania - Contributions of Romanian Jews to culture and civilization, Hasefer Publishing House, Bucharest 2004, in Romanian 215–216)
Allgemeine deutsche Biographie & Neue deutsche Biographie Bd.4,Duncker & Humblot, Berlin 1959
 Magdalene Moureau, Gerald Brace, Dictionnaire du petrole et d'autres sources d'energie –anglais- français Ed. Technip 2008
 E H J Rosenberg- The History of selective solvents, 1st World Petroleum Congress, 18–24 July 1933, London, UK
Dr. L. Edeleanu  – Ludovic Marzec, in the Monit. Petr. Roumanie, obituary article – 1941

Further reading
S. Benari, Lazăr Edeleanu, Editura Stiințifică și enciclopedică, București, 1982 (in Romanian)
O. Păduraru -Bibliografia lucrărilor și brevetelor în limba engleză de dr. L. Edeleanu (Anglo-Rumanian Bibliography of works and brevets of dr L.Edeleanu), București 1946.
I. Drimuș, C. Tache  – Lazăr Edeleanu, precursor al chimizării petrolului , (in Romanian) in Revista de chimie 1958
Robert Treybal-  Liquid extraction  –  McGraw Hill Book Co, 1951 first edition
Avelino Sequeira –  Lubricant base oil and wax processing CRC Press 1994
Alan A. Comyns – Encyclopedic Dictionary of Named Processes in Chemical    Technology- CRC Press 1999

External links
 biography – in Romanian

1861 births
1941 deaths
Scientists from Bucharest
Romanian Jews
Romanian chemists
Saint Sava National College alumni
Humboldt University of Berlin alumni
Academic staff of the University of Bucharest